Kamal ol Din Poshteh (also Romanized as Kamāl ol Dīn Poshteh, Kamāl Ed Dīn Poshteh, Kamāl ed Dīn Poshteh, and Kamāl od Dīn Poshteh) is a village in Gel-e Sefid Rural District, in the Central District of Langarud County, Gilan Province, Iran. At the 2006 census, its population was 202, in 61 families.

References 

Populated places in Langarud County